Ivy Chen Yi-han (born 12 November 1982) is a Taiwanese actress.

In 2002, she appeared in the Taiwanese variety show Guess and was a contestant in the "Do Not Judge a Book by Its Cover" (人不可貌相) segment. She was later signed by a talent agent from Prajna Works and made appearances in many commercials and music videos.

Early life 
She graduated with an information management degree from Jinwen University of Science and Technology.

Personal life 
In August 2018, Chen married Taiwanese director Hsu Fu-hsiang (许富翔).

In Feb 2019, She has a son named Xia Chu (小初)

Filmography

Film

Television series

Music video appearances

Awards and nominations

References

External links

1982 births
Living people
Taiwanese Buddhists
Taiwanese film actresses
Taiwanese television actresses
Actresses from Taipei
21st-century Taiwanese actresses